Di Giorgio is an unincorporated community in Kern County, California.

The first post office at Di Giorgio opened in 1944. The name honors Joseph Di Giorgio, agricultural entrepreneur and founder of DiGiorgio Corporation.  Di Giorgio overlies the large Mountain View Oil Field, and gives its name to one of the field's many productive areas.

See also
DiGiorgio Elementary School

References

Unincorporated communities in Kern County, California
Unincorporated communities in California